The Melbourne rail network is a passenger and freight train system in the city of Melbourne, Victoria, Australia. The metropolitan passenger rail network is centred on the Melbourne CBD and consists of 222 stations across 16 lines, which served a ridership of 99.5 million over the year 2021-2022. It is the core of the larger Victorian railway network, with links to both intrastate and interstate systems.

The first steam train in Australia commenced service in Melbourne in 1854, with the metropolitan network having grown over the last two centuries to cover much of the city. Metro Trains Melbourne operates the Melbourne metropolitan railway network under franchise from the Government of Victoria, while the government-owned entity V/Line operates trains from Melbourne across regional Victoria. 

The metropolitan network is a suburban rail system designed to transport passengers from Melbourne's suburbs into the Melbourne central business district (CBD) and associated city loop stations, with the main hub at Flinders Street station. Southern Cross station is the main interchange station between metropolitan and regional V/Line services. A new underground line is currently under construction as part of the Metro Tunnel project, which aims to increase network capacity and provide Melbourne with a turn-up-and-go metro-like service. A major new orbital line is also under construction, and would be the network's first autonomous line.

A total length of 998 km of track is owned by VicTrack and leased to train operators through Public Transport Victoria. The railway network is primarily at ground level, with some underground and elevated sections. There were more than 170 level crossings before the Level Crossing Removal Project commenced in 2015 to grade separate 110 of the busiest crossings and rebuild 51 railway stations, with 67 crossings removed by December 2022. The metropolitan network operates primarily between 5:00 a.m. and midnight, with 24-hour services from Friday to Sunday. Some tracks are also used by freight trains and V/Line regional services.

In addition to the primary commuter and freight railway networks, Melbourne also features heritage railways such as Puffing Billy and has the world's largest urban tram network.

History

First railway 
On 7 September 1851, a public meeting called for the construction of Australia's first railway to linking Melbourne and Sandridge (now known as Port Melbourne), which led to the establishment of the privately owned Melbourne and Hobson's Bay Railway Company in 1853.

On 8 February 1853, the Government also approved the establishment of the Geelong and Melbourne Railway Company and the Melbourne, Mount Alexander and Murray River Railway Company. Work began in March 1853 on the Sandridge railway line, stretching  from the Melbourne (or City) terminus (on the site of modern-day Flinders Street station) to Sandridge. The line was owned and operated by Melbourne and Hobson's Bay Railway Company, opening in 1854.

In 1855, the Government conducted enquiries and carried out surveys into country railways. On 1 April 1856, the Railway Department was established as part of the Board of Land and Works with George Christian Darbyshire being appointed Engineer in Chief. On 23 May of that year the Melbourne, Mount Alexander and Murray River Railway Company was taken over by the Government.

Trains were ordered from Robert Stephenson and Company of the United Kingdom. The first train was locally built by Robertson, Martin & Smith, however, owing to delays in shipping. Australia's first steam locomotive was built in ten weeks and cost £2,700. Forming the first steam train to travel in Australia, it made its maiden trip on 12 September 1854.

The opening of the line occurred during the period of the Victorian gold rush—a time when both Melbourne and Victoria undertook massive capital works, each with its own gala opening. The inaugural journey on the Sandridge line was no exception. According to the Argus newspaper's report of the next day: "Long before the hour appointed . . . a great crowd assembled round the station at the Melbourne terminus, lining the whole of Flinders Street". Lieutenant-Governor Sir Charles Hotham and Lady Hotham were aboard the train—which consisted of two first class carriages and one second class—and were presented with satin copies of the railway's timetable and bylaws.

The trip took 10 minutes, none of the later stations along the line having been built yet. On arriving at Station Pier (onto which the tracks extended), it was hailed with gun-salutes by the warships HMS Electra and HMS Fantome.

By March 1855, the four engines ordered from the UK were all in service, with trains running every half-hour. They were named Melbourne, Sandridge, Victoria, and Yarra (after the Yarra River over which the line crossed).

Early private companies 

The Melbourne and Hobson's Bay Railway Company opened Melbourne's second railway on 13 May 1857, a 4.5 km line from the Melbourne (or City) Terminus to St Kilda. The line was later extended by the St Kilda and Brighton Railway Company, which opened a line from St Kilda to Brighton in 1857.

The first country line opened in 1857, when the Geelong and Melbourne Railway Company started services on its line from Geelong to Newport. In 1859, the government-owned Victorian Railways Williamstown line opened, connecting Williamstown and Geelong to Spencer Street station.

More country lines followed in 1859 when the Victorian Railways opened a line from Footscray, on the Williamstown line, to Sunbury. The Victorian Railways had taken over construction from the Melbourne, Mount Alexander and Murray River Railway Company, established in 1853 to build a railway to Echuca, but which had failed to make any progress.

The first line to Melbourne's south-eastern suburbs was opened in 1859 by the Melbourne and Suburban Railway Company, running from Princes Bridge railway station to Punt Road (Richmond), South Yarra, and Prahran. That line was extended to Windsor in 1860, connecting with the St Kilda and Brighton Railway Company line from St Kilda. The new line replaced the indirect St Kilda and Windsor line to the city, which was closed in 1867.

Another suburban line was built by the Melbourne and Essendon Railway Company in 1860, running from North Melbourne to Essendon, with a branch line from Newmarket to Flemington Racecourse, which opened in 1861. On the eastern side of the city, the Melbourne and Suburban Railway Company opened a branch line from Richmond to Burnley and Hawthorn in 1861.

By that point, the railways of Melbourne were a disjointed group of city-centric lines, with various companies operating from three unconnected city terminals—Princes Bridge, Flinders Street, and Spencer Street stations.

The smaller companies quickly encountered financial problems. The St Kilda and Brighton Railway Company and Melbourne and Suburban Railway Company were absorbed by the Melbourne and Hobson's Bay Railway Company in 1865, forming the Melbourne and Hobsons Bay United Railway Company. The Melbourne and Essendon Railway Company was taken over by the Victorian Government in 1867. The Melbourne and Hobsons Bay United Railway Company was not taken over by the Victorian Government until 1878.

The terminals themselves were linked in 1879, when track was built at street level along the southern side of Flinders Street, connecting with Spencer Street station, although the track was only used at night, for freight traffic. It was not until 1889 that the two-track Flinders Street Viaduct was built between the two city terminus stations.

Outward expansion also continued, with major trunk lines being opened in rural Victoria. The Victorian Railways extended its line to Broadmeadows in 1872, as part of the line to Seymour and Albury-Wodonga. In 1879, the Gippsland line was opened from South Yarra to Caulfield, Pakenham and Bairnsdale.

Land boom lines 

The 1870s and 1880s were a time of great growth and prosperity in Melbourne. Land speculation companies were formed, to buy up outer suburban land cheaply, and to agitate for suburban railways to be built or extended to serve these land holdings and increase land values. By 1880 the "Land Boom" was in full swing in Victoria, with the passing of the Railway Construction Act 1884, later known as the Octopus Act for the 66 lines across the state that were authorised in it.

The Frankston line began with the opening of a line from Caulfield to Mordialloc in 1881, reaching the terminus in 1882. A second new suburban railway line was opened from Spencer Street Station to Coburg in 1884, and extended to Somerton in 1889, meeting the main line from Spencer Street to Wodonga. Land developers opened a private railway from Newport to Altona in 1888, but it was closed in 1890, due to lack of demand.

The line from Hawthorn was extended, to Camberwell in 1882, Lilydale in 1883, and Healesville in 1889. In addition, a branch line (now known as the Belgrave line) was opened from Ringwood to Upper Ferntree Gully in 1889. A short branch two station was also opened from Hawthorn to Kew in 1887. The Brighton Beach line was also extended to Sandringham in 1887.

In 1888, railways came to the north eastern suburbs with the opening of the Inner Circle line from Spencer Street station via Royal Park station to what is now Victoria Park station, and then on to Heidelberg. A branch was also opened off the Inner Circle in Fitzroy North, to Epping and Whittlesea in 1888 and 1889. Trains between Spencer Street and Heidelberg reversed at Victoria Park until a link was opened between Victoria Park and Princes Bridge in 1901.

The Outer Circle line opened in 1890, linking Oakleigh (on the Gippsland line) to Riversdale (with a branch to Camberwell on the Lilydale line) and Fairfield (on the Heidelberg line). Originally envisaged to link the Gippsland line with Spencer Street station in the 1870s, this reason disappeared with the building of a direct link via South Yarra before the line had even opened. The line saw little traffic as it traversed empty paddocks, and with no through traffic, the Outer Circle was closed in sections between 1893 and 1897. The Camberwell to Ashburton stretch of the Outer Circle re-opened in 1899, then in 1900, part of the northern section of the Outer Circle reopened as a shuttle service between East Camberwell and Deepdene station. This line closed in 1927.

At the same time as the Outer Circle, a railway was opened from Burnley to Darling and a junction with the Outer Circle at Waverley Road (near the modern East Malvern). A stub of the future Glen Waverley line, it was cut back to Darling in 1895.

The land boom railway building hit a peak with the construction of the Rosstown Railway between Elsternwick and Oakleigh. Built by William Murry Ross, the line was planned from the 1870s to serve a sugar beet mill near Caulfield. Construction commenced in 1883, followed by rebuilding in 1888. Ross's debt grew, and he attempted to sell the line many times without success. The line never opened to traffic and was later dismantled.

The stock market crash of 1891 lead to an extended period of economic depression, and put an end to railway construction until the next decade.

By the 1900s, the driving force for new railway lines were the farmers in what is now Melbourne's outer suburbs. In the Dandenong Ranges a narrow gauge 762 mm line was opened from Upper Ferntree Gully to Belgrave and Gembrook in 1900 to serve the local farming and timber community. In the Yarra Valley a branch was opened from Lilydale to Yarra Junction and Warburton in 1901. Part of this line is now listed on the Victorian Heritage Register.

In 1901, in preparation for the occasion of a royal visit by the Duke of York, the first Australian royal train was assembled in Melbourne.

The Heidelberg line was extended to Eltham in 1902 and Hurstbridge in 1912. The freight only Mont Park line was also opened in 1911, branching from Macleod. Finally on the Mornington Peninsula, a branch was built from Bittern to Red Hill in 1921.

Electrification 

Planning for electrification was started by Victorian Railways chairman Thomas James Tait, who engaged English engineer Charles Hesterman Merz to deliver a report on the electrification of the Melbourne suburban network. His first report in 1908 recommended a three-stage plan over 2 years, covering 200 route km of existing lines and almost 500 suburban carriages (approximately 80 trains). The report was considered by the Government and the Railway Commissioners, and Merz was engaged to deliver a second report based on their feedback.

Delivered in 1912, this second report recommended an expanded system of electrification to 240 route km. of existing lines (463 track km), and almost 800 suburban carriages (approximately 130 trains). The works were approved by the State Government in December 1912. It was envisaged that the first electric trains would be running by 1915, and the project would be completed by 1917. However, progress fell behind because World War I restrictions prevented electrical equipment being imported from the United Kingdom.

Rolling stock construction continued, with a number of older suburban carriages converted for electric use as the Swing Door trains, while the first of the Tait trains were introduced as steam hauled carriages. Track expansion was also carried out, with four tracks being provided between South Yarra and Caulfield, as well as grade separation from roads. Victorian Railways in 1918 opened the Newport Power Station, the largest power station in the urban area, to supply electricity as part of the electrification project. The State Electricity Commission of Victoria was formed in 1921 but did not take over Newport A power station until 1951.

The first trials did not occur until October 1918 on the Flemington Racecourse line. Driver training continued on this line until 18 May 1919, when the first electric train ran between Sandringham and Essendon, simulating revenue services. Electric services started on 28 May 1919 with the first train running to Essendon, then on to Sandringham, with full services started the next day. The Burnley–Darling line, the Fawkner line, the reopened branch to Altona, and the Williamstown line followed in 1920.

The line to Broadmeadows, the Whittlesea line to Reservoir, the Bendigo line to St Albans, and the inner sections of the Hurstbridge line were electrified in 1921. The Gippsland line to Dandenong and Frankston line were electrified in 1922, as was the inner section of the Ringwood line due to regrading works.

The original electrification scheme was completed in 1923, but over the next three years a number of short extensions were carried out. The Ashburton line was electrified in 1924, final works on the Lilydale line were completed in 1925, as was electrification on the line to Upper Ferntree Gully. Electrification on the outer ends of the Hurstbridge line were completed by 1926, the Whittlesea line to Thomastown was electrified in 1929, and the Burnley - Darling line was extended to Glen Waverley in 1930 to become the Glen Waverley line.

Post-War rebuilding

Railways experienced increased patronage into the 1940s, but railway improvements recommended in the Ashworth Improvement Plan were delayed until after World War II. It was not until 1950 that the Victorian Railways were able to put their Operation Phoenix rebuilding plan into action. The delivery of the Harris trains, the first steel suburban trains on the network, enabled the retirement of the oldest of the Swing Door trains.

Railway lines were extended during this period to encompass Melbourne's growing suburbia. The Ashburton line was extended along the old Outer Circle track formation to Alamein station in 1948. The Fawkner line to Upfield and the Reservoir line to Lalor were both electrified in 1959, the Epping line reaching Epping in 1964. A great deal of track amplification was also undertaken, with a number of single line sections eliminated.

The Upper Ferntree Gully to Belgrave section of the Gembrook narrow gauge line was converted to broad gauge and electrified in 1962. The remainder of the line was closed in 1954, but has been progressively reopened by the Puffing Billy Railway. The Pakenham line was electrified in 1954 as part of the works being carried out on the Gippsland line, but suburban services to Pakenham did not start until 1975.

During this rebuilding, a number of little used lines were closed on the edges of Melbourne. The Bittern to Red Hill line closed in 1953, the line between Epping and Whittlesea closed in 1959, and the Lilydale to Warburton line closed in 1964. The final stages of the rebuilding stretched into the 1970s, with track amplification carried out to Footscray, and Box Hill, and the first deliveries of the stainless steel Hitachi trains.

Detailed planning for the Doncaster line also commenced in this period, and by 1972 the route was decided upon. Despite rising costs, the state governments of the period continued to make assurances that the line would be built, but by 1984 land for the line had been sold.

Modernisation 

By the 1970s, Melbourne's railway network was run down, with the last major investment on the suburban tracks having taken place nearly fifty years earlier. Sixty-year-old Tait trains (known colloquially as "red rattlers") were still in operation, and inner city congestion at Flinders Street led to peak hour delays. In February 1971, the Melbourne Underground Rail Loop Act was passed, establishing the Melbourne Underground Rail Loop Authority (MURLA) to build a connecting series of tunnels from the major stations along the north, south, east and west extremities of the Melbourne CBD. The project ran for over 14 years, opening progressively between 1981 and 1985. The loop was designed and constructed to improve the capacity of Flinders Street and Spencer Street stations to handle suburban trains and to offer easier connections for users.

Other major changes took place in 1976 when the government authority overseeing Victorian Railways became VicRail and was gradually restructured along corporate lines. Following the restructure, in 1980 the Victorian Transport Study, better known as the Lonie Report, was delivered and called for financial rationalisation. The closure of the Port Melbourne, St. Kilda, Altona, Williamstown, Alamein and Sandringham lines was also recommended, along with their replacement with bus routes instead. These recommendations and cuts were not enacted, however many uneconomical branch lines were closed throughout the rest of the state. The line between Lilydale and Healesville was closed in 1980, now used by the Yarra Valley Railway beyond Yarra Glen. The branch from Baxter to Mornington was closed in 1981, but the line south of Moorooduc is now operated by the Mornington Railway as a tourist route.

The Metrol train control centre was opened in 1980 to coordinate trains throughout the network using computer software that remains in use today. Public transport in Melbourne was also reorganised, with the Metropolitan Transit Authority (MTA) formed in 1983 to coordinate all train, tram and bus services in the city to improve interoperability. With the electrification of the Werribee line in 1983, followed two years later by an extension of the Altona line to Laverton, and the City Loop in full operation by 1985, the last major modernisation of Melbourne's train lines in the 20th century was complete.

Isolated from the City Loop, the Port Melbourne and St Kilda lines were converted to standard gauge light rail in 1987 to accommodate tram routes 111 (now route 109) and 96. The route 96 remains one of the world's top 10 tram routes, and Melbourne's busiest.

The early 1990s saw further changes, with the MTA reborn as the Public Transport Corporation, trading as "The Met".

State Governments of both sides of politics began to push for reform of the railway network, proposing conversion of the Upfield, Williamstown and Alamein lines to light rail. These proposals failed, with the Upfield line instead receiving a series of upgrades to replace labour-intensive manual signalling systems. Federal government funding was made available for the electrification of the Cranbourne line, which was completed in 1995. Rationalisation of the Jolimont rail yard commenced, enabling the creation and expansion of Melbourne Park in 1988 and 1996, and the future construction of Federation Square in 2001.

Upon the Kennett Government's election in 1992, a number of controversial reforms to the operation of the railway system were initiated, with guards being abolished from suburban trains and train drivers taking over the task of door operation. Stations were de-staffed, and the Metcard ticketing system was introduced to phase out the old scratch ticketing system. Over this period more than $250 million of operating cost was stripped from the Melbourne network, as the government sought to reign in growing state debt of $32 billion.

Privatisation
In 1997, "The Met" was split into two operating units —Hillside Trains and Bayside Trains, each to be franchised to a different private operator. Ownership of land and infrastructure for rail and tram services was transferred to a new Victorian Government agency, VicTrack. In addition, a statutory office was created in Government—the Director of Public Transport—with specific responsibility for entering into franchise agreements with public transport operators for the operation of rail and tram services throughout Victoria. By 1999, the privatisation process was complete, with Connex Melbourne and M>Train each operating half of the network. In 2003, the parent company of M>Train (National Express) withdrew from operating public transport in Victoria, and their half of the suburban network was passed to Connex as part of a renegotiated contract.

The franchising contracts contained provisions for the new operators to refurbish the Comeng trains, and to replace the older Hitachi trains. Connex purchased Alstom X'Trapolis sets, while M>Train chose Siemens Nexas units.

In May 2005, the State Government commissioned a A$25 million study into the feasibility of a third track for the Dandenong line to increase capacity for the rapidly growing suburban area. The cost of the triplication process was expected to be as high as A$1 billion, as project activities would have included the organization of corresponding bus services for the rail line, changes to stations and platforms along the line, and the improvement of the signalling system. This project was ultimately sidelined and not delivered by the Brumby Government.

In 2006, Professor Paul Mees and a group of academics estimated that privatisation had cost taxpayers $1.2 billion more than if the system had remained both publicly owned and operated. With the franchise extensions in 2009, taxpayers were to pay an estimated $2.1 billion more by 2010. However, the Institute of Public Affairs released its own report into Melbourne's privatisation, which assessed it as a modest success and observed that a 37.6% increase in patronage on the metropolitan rail system had reversed years of patronage decline due to poor quality services. The Auditor General of Victoria also performed a comprehensive audit report into the franchises and found that "the franchises represent reasonable value for money".

Ridership boom and Metro Trains Melbourne 

Beginning in the mid-2000s, a rapid increase in patronage of Melbourne's train network occurred. In the three-year period between financial year 2005 and 2008 rail patronage grew by 35 per cent. Trips grew from 148 million in 2004 to more than 200 million in 2008.

In November 2007, Singapore's SMRT Transit and Hong Kong's MTR Corporation Limited expressed interest in taking control of Melbourne's suburban rail network from Connex in November 2009, when their contract was to be reviewed.

On 25 June 2009, Connex lost its bid to renew its contract with the Victorian Government. Hong Kong backed and owned MTR Corporation took over the Melbourne train network on 30 November 2009, operating as a locally themed consortium Metro Trains Melbourne. MTR is a non-public railway owner and operator in Hong Kong where it is well known for constructing Transit Oriented Developments (TODS) above and around its stations. Metro began operation on 1 December 2009, promising to draw on its international experience to improve Melbourne's rail operations.

Transport Minister Lynne Kosky stated that the Government's A$10.5 billion, 10-year major transport plan, announced in May 2006, had significantly underestimated the usage rates of public transport. Original assessments had forecast increases of around 3-4%, far short of the 10% seen year-on-year. The State Government responded by purchasing new trains and introduced a new ticketing option that enabled commuters to pay a reduced fare if their journey finished by 7am.

In 2008, the Brumby Government announced a $14.1 billion Victorian Transport Plan to augment Melbourne’s rail network. The plan included:

 The Metro Tunnel, costing more than $4.5 billion, and consisting of an underground train network —the first new underground rail line since the construction of the City Loop 25 years earlier— from Dynon to South Yarra. Aimed at "relieving overcrowding on the busy suburban lines from Melbourne’s west," the underground line was also designed to provide direct rail access to Melbourne University, the Women's Hospital and the Royal Children's Hospital. 
 Rolling stock, $2.65 billion for up to 70 new trains, including 32 High Capacity Metro Trains.
 Rail extensions to Cranbourne East and Mernda, and electrification to Melton.
 Improvements to train operations, at a cost of $200 million
 Upgrades to metro stations, costing $50 million, and new stations in growth areas at a cost of $220 million
 A Park & Ride expansion package costing $60 million.
The previously reduced Early Bird ticket was also made free as part of these changes, following a trial on the Frankston and Sydenham lines.

Following the investment announcement, the plan for the introduction of more than 200 new weekly train services was released to tackle overcrowding on the city's busiest train lines, a problem that had been attributed to a lack of trains and falling reliability.

On 1 May 2009 the State Government announced that they had committed $562.3 million in the 2009 State Budget for the extension of the Epping line 3.5 kilometres north to South Morang. Construction started in 2010 and was completed in 2012.

Network development and level crossing removals 
In May 2011, operations commenced on a new metropolitan timetable, rewritten for the first time since 1996 with over 600 additional weekday services added. In 2012, a Public Transport Development Authority trading as Public Transport Victoria (PTV) was established to coordinate, plan and regulate the state's public transport services, including the metropolitan rail system. In the same year, the Metcard ticketing system was discontinued, completing the controversial network-wide roll-out of the new Myki smart card system. On 27 March 2013, Public Transport Victoria published its Network Development Plan Metropolitan Rail, detailing a 4-stage plan spread over 20 years to redevelop Melbourne's rail system into a 'metro-style' network, by separating train lines and creating point-to-point lines, upgrading to high-capacity signalling and ordering new trains.

A key campaign promise of the Andrews government prior to its election in 2014 was to remove 50 level crossings in 8 years, the most intensive such program in Melbourne's history. Because of Melbourne's generally level topography, the suburban rail network was constructed with a large number of level crossings. By 2014, over 170 remained, due to a lack of funding for grade separations after 1918. The Government's Level Crossing Removal Project became a resounding political success, despite concerns it was creating poor value-for-money infrastructure and controversy about the selection of elevated rail as a method for removing some crossings. 

By 2018, 29 level crossings had been fully grade separated, well ahead of the government's original schedule, and a further 25 crossings were added to the program to be completed by 2025. The project includes rebuilding or upgrading 27 train stations, such as Bentleigh and Clayton railway stations, or laying new track, such as the duplication of 1.2 km of single track railway between Heidelberg and the rebuilt Rosanna stations. Large sections of elevated rail have been built on the Pakenham and Cranbourne lines, and further sections are planned for the Mernda and Upfield lines, including a 4 km section on the Mernda line in Preston.

The Regional Rail Link project, which created a new Deer Park–West Werribee railway line in the city's west with new stations at Wyndham Vale and Tarneit, as well as adding an additional track pair between Sunshine and Southern Cross, was completed in mid-2015. Although the project was intended to provide segregated routes for regional trains to Geelong, Ballarat and Bendigo, rapid population growth in areas served by the new line forced these services to perform the role of an outer suburban network, causing significant delays and overcrowding.

A redesigned network map was released by PTV at the end of 2016, which replaced an emphasis on fare zones with delineation of individual lines and service patterns. The new map also incorporated regional services and was designed to be accessible to passengers with the most common types of colour blindness.

Metro's contract to operate the suburban network was renewed in 2017 for a further 7 years. The renegotiated contracts included higher monthly performance targets, which it failed to meet 6 times in the first year of the contract's operation.

Construction of an extension of the South Morang line to Mernda commenced in 2016 and was completed on 29 August 2018. The project included 8 km of new electrified railway, new stations at Middle Gorge and Hawkstowe, and a new terminus at a rebuilt Mernda station.

In April 2019 the Victorian Government announced that Public Transport Victoria would be merged along with VicRoads into a new Victorian Department of Transport.

Future expansion 
A number of major expansion projects are under construction or planned for the network. In addition there are a number of major upgrade projects, including the Level Crossing Removal Project, which is removing 110 level crossings and rebuilding 51 stations across the city.

Metro Tunnel 

In February 2015, the State Government established the Melbourne Metro Rail Authority to oversee planning for new twin 9-kilometre rail tunnels through the central city between South Kensington station and South Yarra. The new Metro Tunnel will have five new underground stations and connect the Pakenham and Cranbourne lines with the Sunbury line, creating a new route through the CBD as an alternative to the City Loop. New underground stations will be built at Arden, Parkville, Domain and there will be two new CBD stations, State Library and Town Hall. Enabling works were underway by 2016 and major construction work on the tunnel and stations began in 2017. The project has an estimated cost of $11 billion and is scheduled to be complete by 2025.

In September 2016, the State Government ordered 65 new High Capacity Metro Trains for delivery from mid-2019, which will eventually become the primary rolling stock used in the Metro Tunnel.

In April, June and July 2019, multiple rail lines in Melbourne's east were shut down for several weeks to allow construction of the tunnel entrances near Kensington and South Yarra. The first tunnel boring machine began to be assembled in North Melbourne in June 2019. In May 2021, TBM Meg broke through at the future site of Town Hall station, marking the completion of tunneling for the project. TBM Millie, Alice and Joan completed tunneling over the previous month. The tunneling phase lasted 20 months.

Airport rail link 

A rail link to Melbourne Airport has been proposed repeatedly since the airport's construction, with a variety of routes and service models suggested, but construction has never commenced. In July 2018, the Federal and State Governments each pledged A$5 billion (for a total of A$10 billion) to construct a rail link. The Federal Government proposed four preferred routes for the link, with one proposal running via a direct tunnel to Highpoint Shopping Centre and the others linking to existing stations in Broadmeadows, Flemington or Sunshine. 

An assessment of the four preferred routes conducted by Rail Projects Victoria culminated in the route via Sunshine station being selected. The line with run through the Metro Tunnel and will include a new intermediate station at Keilor East to serve Melbourne's north-west. Construction began in 2022 with completion expected by 2029.

Suburban Rail Loop 

In August 2018, in the run-up to the 2018 Victorian state election, the State Government pledged $300 million to complete a business case and secure funding to construct a new railway through suburban Melbourne. The project is designed to link major activity centres and amenities such as hospitals, shopping centres, universities, and Melbourne Airport. The proposal would connect most existing railway lines through middle suburbs and enable easier intra-suburban travel.The Suburban Rail Loop (SRL) would connect the existing station at Cheltenham with other existing stations at Clayton, Glen Waverley, Box Hill, Heidelberg, Reservoir, Fawkner, Broadmeadows, Sunshine and Werribee. It will also link to new stations to be built in areas that have long been promised rail connections, including Monash University, Burwood, Doncaster, Bundoora and Melbourne Airport. The first stage, SRL East, from Cheltenham to Box Hill is under construction and will open by 2035, with other sections progressively opening until the full line is operational by 2050.

Other planned extensions 

The State Government is currently preparing a business case for electrification and extension of the Frankston line to Baxter in Melbourne's South. The Federal Government committed $225 million towards the project in its 2017-2018 budget.

During the 2018 Victorian state election, the State Government also announced its Western Rail Plan, which would quadruplicate and electrify the rail lines to Melton and Wyndham Vale, allowing Metro services. Under this plan, Metro and V/Line regional services would be separated, allowing for higher speed trains to be introduced to Geelong and Ballarat. A new connection between Sunshine and Southern Cross Station to be built as part of the Airport rail link could add extra capacity for regional and metro lines. According to the Government, these lines could be fully electrified to Geelong and Ballarat and run at speeds of up to 250 km/h, significantly above the 160 km/h limit of current V/Line VLocity trains. Planning for the fast rail and electrification of the lines to Melton and Wyndham Vale will occur alongside planning for the Airport rail link, with construction set to start by 2022.

Infrastructure

Railway 

The rail network within the Melbourne metropolitan area includes dedicated passenger lines, dedicated freight lines, and lines shared by the two types of traffic.

Most suburban passenger lines operated by the metropolitan rail franchisee, currently Metro Trains Melbourne, are electrified with 1500 V DC overhead catenary. Many of the suburban lines share tracks with regional passenger trains operated by V/Line, and some V/Line services provide "peri-urban" service to areas of Melbourne not reached by the electrified network. Metro also operates an isolated section of unelectrified passenger line between Frankston and Stony Point.

The network is centred on Flinders Street and Southern Cross stations in the CBD, which are joined directly by a six-track viaduct and indirectly by the underground four-track City Loop. From this central core, nearly all tracks pass through the three major junction stations of North Melbourne, Jolimont, and Richmond; and from there extend outwards to the west, north-east and east of the city respectively. There are few connections between the radial lines outside of the central city. Capital investment in the network since 1990 has focused on relieving "bottlenecks" near the central core caused by the large number of lines converging, most significantly with the Regional Rail Link project which provided additional capacity between Sunshine and the city.

Much of the metropolitan network is double track or multiple pairs of tracks. There are small sections of triple track, which are used to allow express trains to overtake stopping trains in peak hour. Nearly the entirety of the Altona and Stony Point branches are single track, and many of the outer suburban passenger lines also have sections of single track, usually where demand for frequent services is low.

The metropolitan network has a large number of level crossings. Many have been gradually removed by grade separating road and rail traffic: by 2016, some 228 grade separations had been undertaken in the Melbourne area, leaving 170 level crossings, although very few projects of this nature had been undertaken in the latter half of the 20th century. The Level Crossing Removal Project, which began in 2014, aimed to increase the rate of level crossing removals to over 6 each year for at least 8 years, and the project was later extended for a further four years.

Stations 

There are 218 stations in Melbourne, operated by Metro Trains Melbourne.

Passenger information 

Timetable information is available to passengers at stations through the PRIDE II system, which is an electronic timetable and announcement system, and stands for Passenger Real-time Information Dissemination Equipment. The system consists of:
 The control system, situated at Metrol.
 Control stations, at which staff update information, and announcements and CCTV recordings are dealt with for nearby stations.
 Public address systems at each station on the network. The PRIDE system automatically announces when a train is due soon, delayed, or cancelled; this is done via the rail telephone network.
 PRIDE "talking boxes" installed on each platform of all stations.
 Electronic information displays.

Control data comes from two locations: Metrol, and control stations. Next train data and times are automatically updated by the train control systems, with manual overrides also possible.

All stations are provided with "talking boxes" which have two buttons and a small speaker.
The green button, when pressed, contacts the PRIDE controller over the rail telephone network, identifying itself by the DTMF tones that correspond to the ID number assigned to the box. The system then reads out times and destinations for the next two services to depart that platform (or, in the case of stations with a single island platform with departures either side, both platforms). The red button when pressed, gives the user two way communication with the closest control station.

Busy stations are often provided with an electronic LED s, which indicate the destination, time, stopping pattern summary, and minutes to departure for the next train on the platform.

Stations on the City Loop, in addition to North Melbourne, Richmond, and Box Hill stations, have CRT screen s, although some of these have recently been replaced by widescreen LCD screens. These displays show in detail the destination, scheduled and actual departure time, and all stations the next train stops at. Also shown is the destination and time of the following train, and the system is capable of providing suggested connections and warn of service interruptions.

On Sunday, 26 September 2010, the PRIDE system was upgraded with new voice announcements. The voice is now female, and now advises to touch on and off when using Myki.

As part of the Bayside Rail Upgrade, stations on the Frankston line will receive new "network status boards". These LCD screens provide travel information on all of Melbournes 16 railway lines as well as tram & bus services, including delays, replacement services or planned disruptions.

Safeworking 

Most lines in Melbourne operate under an automatic block system of safeworking with three-position power signalling. This permits signals to operate automatically with the passage of trains, enforcing the distance between them. At junctions signals are manually controlled from signal boxes, with interlockings used to ensure conflicting paths are not set. The Flemington Racecourse line has two-position automatic signalling, a variant of the three-position system.

The outer end of the Hurstbridge line used to be operated with token based systems and two-position manual signalling, where access to the line is based upon possession of a token. It was dismantled in 2013.

Train stops are used to enforce stop indications on signals—should a train pass a signal, the train's brakes will automatically be applied. Trains are also fitted with pilot valves, a form of dead man's switch that applies the brakes should the driver fail to maintain a foot or hand pilot valve in a set position. The "VICERS" vigilance control and event recorder system is also being currently fitted to suburban trains to provide an additional level of safety.

Train control 
The main control room for the rail network is Metrol. Located in the Melbourne CBD, it controls signals in the inner suburbs, tracking the location of all trains, as well as the handling the distribution of real time passenger information, and manages disruptions to the timetable. Additional signal boxes are located throughout the network, and in direct communication with Metrol.

Terminology
The railways in Melbourne generally use British-derived terminology. For example:
 Up refers to the direction "towards Melbourne".
 Down refers to the direction "away from Melbourne", or "towards the country".
 Points refers to what are known as railroad switches, or crossovers in American English.
 Signal box refers to the signal control installation (tower in American terminology).
 Gunzel terminology for a railway enthusiast

Patronage
The following table lists patronage figures for the network during the corresponding financial year. Australia's financial years start on 1 July and end on 30 June. Major events that affected the number of journeys made or how patronage is measured are included as notes.

Metropolitan services

Operations
Despite initially being constructed and operated as private railways in the 1850s, following the establishment of the government-owned Victorian Railways in 1858 Melbourne's suburban railway system has been state operated for the majority of its existence. In the 1920s Victorian Railways was the operator of the world's busiest railway station (Flinders Street) and one of the world's busiest railway networks. Following several high-profile collisions in the early 20th century, a number of network safety processes were implemented by the operator to improve passenger safety.

The agency name was shortened to VicRail in the early 1980s and then, later in the decade, the metropolitan system became known as Metropolitan Transit ('The Met') and the regional system became known as V/Line. In preparation for privatisation the suburban system was split into Bayside Trains and Hillside Trains by the Kennett Ministry in 1997. Privatisation was completed in 1999 and M-Train and Connex Melbourne won the tender to operate Bayside, and Hillside trains, respectively. Following M>Train's inability to renegotiate financial arrangements, in 2004 Connex Melbourne assumed responsibility for the entire network. Current operations are provided by Metro Trains Melbourne, an MTR Corporation joint venture.

Operator Timelines

1854–1860 - Geelong and Melbourne Railway Company
1854–1878 - Melbourne and Hobsons Bay Railway Company
1857–1862 - Melbourne and Suburban Railway Company
1858–1983 - Victorian Railways ('VicRail')
1983–1997 - Metropolitan Transit ('The Met')
1997–1999 - Bayside Trains (Caulfield and Northern groups) and Hillside Trains (Clifton Hill and Burnley groups, Showgrounds services)
1999–2004 - M>Train (formerly Bayside Trains) and Connex Melbourne (formerly Hillside Trains)
2004–2009 - Connex Melbourne 
2009–present - Metro Trains Melbourne

Fleet

Current fleet 
The majority of the current suburban train fleet in Melbourne is owned by VicTrack, with the train operator (currently Metro Trains Melbourne) responsible for maintaining the fleet. All trains on the Melbourne suburban network are electric and driver-only operated. Guards on suburban trains were discontinued between 1993 and 1995.

All trains are fitted with power-operated sliding doors which are closed by the driver, but opened by passengers. The doors of newer model HCMT, X'Trapolis and Siemens trains are opened electronically with a button, whilst Comeng trains are slid manually using handles. Trains are fitted with air conditioning, closed-circuit cameras, and emergency intercom systems. Trains are fixed into three car units and may operate alone or in pairs, except for the HCMT trains which run in singular seven car sets.

Decommissioned fleet

Lines 
Melbourne's metropolitan network includes 16 electrified suburban lines and 1 non-electrified line. Many lines have been lengthened over time, most notably the Mernda line from Epping to South Morang in 2012 and again to Mernda in 2018. Lines have also changed terminus or layout, including the forthcoming changes to the Cranbourne, Pakenham and Sunbury lines as part of the Melbourne Metro Rail Project. Numerous proposals for new lines or extensions not yet constructed have been made, including the long-outstanding Doncaster railway line and Rowville railway line.

Electrified lines 

Alamein railway line
Belgrave railway line
Craigieburn railway line
Cranbourne railway line
Flemington Racecourse/Showgrounds railway line
Frankston railway line
Glen Waverley railway line
Hurstbridge railway line
Lilydale railway line
Mernda railway line
Pakenham railway line
Sandringham railway line
Sunbury railway line
Upfield railway line
Werribee railway line
Williamstown railway line
City Loop (incorporated into several other lines)

Non-electrified lines 
Deer Park–West Werribee railway line (non-electrified train service operated by V/Line)
Melton railway line (non-electrified train service operated by V/Line)
Stony Point railway line (non-electrified train service beyond Frankston)

Stony Point line and metropolitan V/Line services 
Stony Point line services operate as shuttles from Frankston station with passengers to and from Flinders Street required to change trains. It is the only non-electrified line operated by Metro Trains, with services being operated using Sprinter diesel multiple units leased from V/Line.

Melton (Ballarat line) and Wyndham Vale (Geelong line) services are operated by V/Line and depart from Southern Cross, but are within the metropolitan ticketing zone. Bacchus Marsh/Melton/Ballarat trains stop at Cobblebank, Rockbank, Caroline Springs, Deer Park and Ardeer. Wyndham Vale/Geelong trains also stop at Ardeer and Deer Park, along with Tarneit. Only Wyndham Vale and Ballarat trains stop at Ardeer, not Geelong trains.

5 morning peak and 3 afternoon peak trains operate to and from Wyndham Vale. One weekday morning service and numerous football services operate to Wyndham Vale.

After the Ballarat Line Upgrade was completed on the 1st of January 2021, during the week, Melton sees services every 20 minutes. This includes the every 40 minutes off peak from trains to/from Ballarat. During the peak, Melton services only stop at Cobblebank, Caroline Springs, Ardeer, Sunshine and Footscray, where as Ballarat (Wendouree) trains stop at all other stations including Sunshine and Footscray, but not Melton. A shuttle service runs from Caroline Springs to Rockbank for anyone willing to travel to Ballarat. On the weekend, all services are every hour.

Sunbury services used to also be operated by V/Line until 2012 when the electrical network was extended to Sunbury and these trains also stopped at Diggers Rest; Sunbury passengers can still catch V/Line trains to or from Bendigo. The redundant carriages were moved onto Bacchus Marsh services instead. V/Line trains used to also operate to Donnybrook, stopping at Craigieburn but since the electrical network was extended to Craigieburn in 2007, trains have stopped terminating at Donnybrook.

Service patterns 

Metropolitan services are operated by Metro Trains Melbourne. Railway lines and service patterns are often classified into groups, which are:
Burnley group
Lilydale, Belgrave, Alamein and Glen Waverley line (blue)
Caulfield group
Pakenham and Cranbourne line (light blue)
Sandringham line (pink)
Clifton Hill group
Mernda and Hurstbridge line (red)
Northern group
Sunbury, Craigieburn and Upfield line (yellow)
Cross-City group
Frankston, Werribee and Williamstown line (green)
Stony Point line (non-electrified train service beyond Frankston)
Special event services
Flemington Racecourse/Showgrounds

All lines (except for the Frankston, Werribee, Williamstown and Sandringham lines) use the city loop. The Clifton Hill Group runs clockwise all day and the Caulfield Group runs Counter-Clockwise all day. The Burnley Group runs counter-clockwise in the morning and switches to clockwise in the afternoon. The Northern Group runs clockwise in the morning and counter-clockwise on the afternoon. As of 1st of January 2021, Frankston and Newport (Werribee and Williamstown) trains have been completely removed out of the City Loop. When the Metro Tunnel opens in 2025, Pakenham, Cranbourne and Sunbury line trains will be removed from the loop, and the Frankston line will move back into the Caulfield loop. Also at this time, the Werribee line will run direct to Sandringham and vice versa.

Melbourne uses clock-face scheduling in off-peak periods, but generally not in rush hour, due to the network operating near to infrastructure capacity and having to accommodate single-line sections, flat junctions, and regional diesel-hauled trains. Frequencies vary according to time of day, day of week and by line. In some places, usually interchange stations, services on two lines combine to provide more frequent services on common sections of tracks. All services become 24-hour from Friday morning to Sunday evening, with at least one departure every hour after 12am.

Along with other Australian railways, Melbourne uses the British terminology of "up" and "down", with "up" being defined as toward Flinders Street station in the CBD.

Fares and tickets 

The myki smart-card ticketing system is the main ticketing system currently in use across Melbourne, introduced in 2010. Prior to December 2012 Melbourne also used a magnetic strip paper ticket system known as the Metcard, first introduced to the railway network in 1996. On 29 December 2012 Metcard was no longer available for use on Melbourne's public transport and completely replaced by myki. Multi-modal tickets were first introduced in Melbourne in 1969 and prior to this train, tram and bus services all had separated ticketing systems.

Host stations and premium stations 
Host stations and premium stations are categories of railway stations on the suburban rail network. A premium station is staffed from first train to last, seven days a week, while a host station is staffed only during the morning peak. Of the 222 (current as of 2021) stations in Melbourne's railway network, there are 82 premium stations, in addition to the five City Loop stations.

Although plans for the premium station program were unveiled in 1991 (under the guise of 'Safe Stations'), the program was commenced in 1994 by the Public Transport Corporation, with Mount Waverley being the first station given premium status. By the end of 1995 the number of staffed stations increased from 35 to 51. It was proposed to upgrade further stations to premium status in the future.

The host station program was introduced by the Victorian Department of Transport in the early 2000s to ensure that over 80% of suburban rail passengers started their journey from a staffed (host or premium) station.

Regional services

V/Line regional services share tracks with several suburban train lines from the outskirts of Melbourne to the regional railway terminus at Southern Cross station (with the Traralgon V/Line rail service terminating at Flinders Street station). The Pakenham line has the longest shared track section which is used by V/Line services to the Traralgon and Bairnsdale. The Sunbury and Craigieburn lines also share lesser sections of track with counterpart regional lines.

The Regional Rail Link project separated suburban services from regional trains on the Geelong, Wendouree (Ballarat) and Bendigo lines. A ceremonial start of construction was held in August 2009 and the project was completed in June 2015.

Freight services

Melbourne also has an extensive network of railway lines and yards to serve freight traffic. In the inner western suburbs of the city, freight trains operate on dedicated lines, but in other areas freight trains share tracks with the suburban Metro Trains Melbourne and regional V/Line passenger services. The majority of freight terminals are located in the inner suburbs around Port of Melbourne, others are located between the Melbourne CBD and Footscray.

Until the 1980s a number of suburban stations had their own goods yards, with freight trains running over the suburban network, often with the E or L class electric locomotives.

Legislation, governance and access

Key statutes 

The prime rail statute in Victoria is the Transport Integration Act.  The Act establishes the Department of Transport as the integration agency for Victoria's transport system.  The Act also establishes and sets the charters of the state agencies charged with providing public transport rail services and managing network access for freight services, namely the Director of Public Transport and V/Line.  In addition, the Act creates VicTrack which owns the public rail network and associated infrastructure.  Another important statute is the Rail Management Act 1996 which confers powers on rail operators and provides for a rail access scheme for the state's rail network.

Safety

Regulation 

The safety of rail operations in Melbourne is regulated by the Rail Safety Act 2006 which applies to all commercial passenger and freight operations as well as tourist and heritage railways. The Act creates a framework containing safety duties for all rail industry participants and requires rail operators who manage infrastructure and rolling stock to obtain accreditation prior to commencing operations.  Accredited rail operators are also required to have a safety management system to guide their operations.

Sanctions applying to the safety scheme established under the Rail Safety Act are contained in the Transport (Compliance and Miscellaneous) Act 1983. The safety regulator for the rail system in Melbourne is the Director, Transport Safety (trading as Transport Safety Victoria) whose office is established under the Transport Integration Act 2010.

Investigation 

Rail operators in Victoria can also be the subject of no blame investigations conducted by the Chief Investigator, Transport Safety or the Australian Transport Safety Bureau(ATSB).  The Chief Investigator is charged by the Transport Integration Act with conducting investigations into rail safety matters including incidents and trends.  ATSB, on the other hand, has jusridiction over the same matters where they occur on the Defined Interstate Rail Network.

Ticketing and conduct 
Ticketing requirements for public transport in Melbourne are mainly contained in the Transport (Ticketing) Regulations 2006 and the Victorian Fares and Ticketing Manual. Rules about safe and fair conduct on trains and trams in Melbourne are generally contained in the Transport (Compliance and Miscellaneous) Act 1983 and the Transport (Conduct) Regulations 2005. If Metro does not reach its Punctuality and Delivery goals they will give out compensation to eligible customers. In the month of December 2014, Metro Trains had a delivery rate of 98.5%, and a Punctuality rate of 93.60%. In 2014, Metro Trains were accused of not stopping at underpopulated suburbs' stations in order to arrive on time, this practise has been condemned by the general public and the media. They have offered compensation to affected passengers.

Tourist and heritage railways 

Tourist and Heritage Railways in Melbourne and Victoria are currently governed by provisions in the Transport (Compliance and Miscellaneous) Act 1983.  In future, they will be regulated by the recently enacted Tourist and Heritage Railways Act 2010, which commenced in October 2011.

See also
 Metro Trains Melbourne
 V/Line
 Freight railways in Melbourne
 Rail transport in Victoria
 Transport Integration Act
 Director of Public Transport
 Tourist and Heritage Railways Act
 Rail Safety Act
 Director, Transport Safety
 Chief Investigator, Transport Safety
 Transport Act 1983
 Transport (Compliance and Miscellaneous) Act 1983

References

Further reading and reviews
 A review of Melbourne's Rail Franchising reforms Currie, Graham (2009) Journeys, Singapore Land Transit Authority Academy
 Refranchising Melbourne's metropolitan train and tram networks Deloitte Touche Thomatsu (2007), Department of Infrastructure
 The reliability of Melbourne's trains 1993-2007 Mees, Dr. Paul (2007); University of Melbourne Urban Planning Program paper

External links
 Public Transport Victoria - official website of Melbourne's public transport authority
 Vicsig - Victorian railways enthusiast website
 Railpage Australia - enthusiast website
 V/LineCars.com - Comprehensive V/Line carriage information & enthusiast website

Public transport in Melbourne
Melbourne
Railways in Melbourne